Song of Soho is a 1930 British musical film directed by Harry Lachman and starring Carl Brisson, Edna Davies and Donald Calthrop. The screenplay concerns an ex-French Foreign Legion soldier who comes to Soho and ends up as a singer in a cafe.

Cast
 Carl Brisson - Carl 
 Edna Davies - Camille 
 Donald Calthrop - Nobby 
 Henry Victor - Henry 
 Lucienne Herval - Lucienne 
 Antonia Brough - Antonia 
 Charles Farrell - Legionnaire 
 Andrea Nijinsky - Dancer

References

External links

1930 films
1930 musical films
Films shot at British International Pictures Studios
Films directed by Harry Lachman
British black-and-white films
British musical films
1930s English-language films
1930s British films